If I Had My Way may refer to:
 If I Had My Way (film), a 1940 musical comedy film directed by David Butler and starring Bing Crosby and Gloria Jean
 If I Had My Way (song), a 1996 single by Big Sugar
 If I Had My Way (album), a 1997 album by Nancy Wilson
 Samson and Delilah (traditional song),  a traditional song, also recorded as "If I Had My Way I'd Tear the Building Down"/"Oh Lord If I Had My Way" by Blind Willie Johnson in 1927